Cobark River, a perennial river of the Manning River catchment, is located in the Upper Hunter district of New South Wales, Australia.

Course and features
Dilgry River rises in the Barrington Tops within the Great Dividing Range, near Tunderbolts Lookout in the Barrington Tops National Park, and flows generally east then south by east, before reaching its confluence with the Cobark River, north north east of Boranel Mountain. The river descends  over its  course.

See also 

 Rivers of New South Wales
 List of rivers of New South Wales (A–K)
 List of rivers of Australia

References

Rivers of New South Wales
Rivers of the Hunter Region